Metallolophia purpurivenata is a moth of the family Geometridae first described by Da-Yong Xue and Hong-Xiang Han in 2004. It is found in Guangxi, China.

References

Moths described in 2004
Pseudoterpnini